Media controversy may refer to:

 Censorship
 Controversy
 Hypodermic needle model
 Media influence
 Media transparency
 Media violence research
 Public outcry
 Wowserism

Media content ratings systems involved in controversies 
 Computer Entertainment Rating Organization
 Entertainment Software Rating Board
 MPAA film rating system
 Office of Film and Literature Classification (Australia)
 Office of Film and Literature Classification (New Zealand)
 Pan European Game Information